Daniel Feitosa de Araújo Monteiro (born 18 September 1992) is a Brazilian futsal player who plays as a winger for Operário Laranjeiras and the Brazilian national futsal team.

References

External links
Liga Nacional de Futsal profile

1992 births
Living people
Brazilian men's futsal players